Denver and Delilah Productions or Denver & Delilah Films is a film production company founded by actress and producer Charlize Theron. It is based in Los Angeles, California.

History
Charlize Theron founded Denver and Delilah Films in 2003, and named the company after her two dogs Denver and Delilah. The company's film productions include the 2003 film Monster, 2006's East of Havana, 2007's Sleepwalking, 2011's Young Adult and 2017's Atomic Blonde.

Collaborations and deals
In July 2013, the company signed on with Bunim/Murray Productions to develop and produce unscripted programming for television. In January 2015, Denver & Delilah signed a first-look deal with Universal Cable Productions to develop and produce scripted series for NBCUniversal, and for that the company hired Laverne McKinnon as head of scripted television. While Beth Kono and A.J. Dix also partnered with Theron on these projects. One project in development, with comic book writer Greg Rucka, is an adaptation of the stop-motion animated comedy web series The Most Popular Girls in School. More recently, her production company received a first-look deal with HBO and HBO Max.

Filmography

Films

Television

References

Mass media companies established in 2003
Companies based in Los Angeles
Film production companies of the United States
Television production companies of the United States